"Under My Skin" is a song by Blue System. It is the first track on their 1988 second studio album, Body Heat, and was released as its second lead single.

The single debuted at number 57 in West Germany for the week of October 24, 1988, and peaked at number 6 three weeks later.

Composition 
The song is written and produced by Dieter Bohlen.

Charts

References 

1988 songs
1988 singles
Blue System songs
Hansa Records singles
Songs written by Dieter Bohlen
Song recordings produced by Dieter Bohlen